Mark Dean (born  December 30, 1971) is a former Bahamian professional basketball player who had eleven-year career in Europe and Israel.

References

1971 births
Living people
Power forwards (basketball)
Bahamian men's basketball players
Sportspeople from Nassau, Bahamas
Bahamian expatriate basketball people in France